Yan Yean was a steam-era railway station on the Whittlesea line in Yan Yean, Victoria, Australia. It is now located on private property.

History
Yan Yean station opened in 1889 and operated until the closure of the line after Lalor Station in 1959, after the electrification of the line to Lalor. Epping station was then re-opened in the 1960s with the electrification of that section of the line. The remaining section of track from Epping to Whittlesea was then dismantled in the 1970s, with the former right-of-way remaining almost intact.

A small siding used by milk trains also was operated from 1926 to 1945.

References

Disused railway stations in Melbourne
Railway stations in Australia opened in 1889